John Michael Cornwall (born 19 August 1934 in Denver, Colorado) is an American theoretical physicist who does research on elementary particle physics and quantum field theory as well as geophysics and physics of near-space. He is known for the Pinch Technique.

Cornwall graduated from Harvard University with a bachelor's degree in 1956 and from the University of Denver with a master's degree in 1959. He graduated in 1962 from the University of California, Berkeley with a doctorate under the supervision of Malvin Ruderman. Cornwall was a postdoctoral fellow at the California Institute of Technology (Caltech) and from 1963 to 1965 at the Institute for Advanced Study. At the University of California, Los Angeles (UCLA) he became in 1965 an assistant professor and in 1974 a full professor.

Cornwall published with Richard E. Norton in 1973 one of the earliest papers on dynamic symmetry breaking in Yang-Mills theories. In the later part of his career he has worked on non-perturbative quantum chromodynamics.

He was an advisor to the Space Sciences Laboratory of the Aerospace Corporation in El Segundo (1962–1993) and to the Institute for Defense Analyses in Alexandria (2002–2015), as well as to the National Aeronautics and Space Administration (NASA). He was a faculty member of the Pardee RAND Graduate School of Public Policy (1999–2005) and a member of the Defense Science Board (1992-1994). For some years he has been a member and now chairman of an advisory board at Livermore National Laboratory (1989–present), and is a long-term member of the JASON Advisory Group.

He was from 1967 to 1969 a Sloan Fellow and from 1968 to 1969 a visiting scientist at the Niels Bohr Institute in Copenhagen. He was a visiting professor for the academic year 1987–1988 at the Massachusetts Institute of Technology and in 1989 at Rockefeller University.

He is a Fellow of the American Physical Society (2005), the New York Academy of Sciences, the American Geophysical Union, and the American Association for the Advancement of Science.

Selected publications
 with Joannis Papavassiliou, Daniele Binosi: The pinch technique and applications to non-abelian gauge theories, Cambridge University Press 2011
 with Richard E. Norton: On the formalism of relativistic many body theory, Annals of Physics, Vol. 91, 1975, p. 106 
 with Roman Jackiw, E. Tomboulis: "Effective action for composite operators", Physical Review D, vol. 10, 1974, pp. 2428-2445 
 with G. Tiktopoulos: On-shell asymptotics of non-abelian gauge fields, Phys. Rev. Lett., vol. 35, 1975, p. 338 
 with G. Tiktopoulos: Infrared Behavior of non-abelian gauge theories, Phys. Rev. D, vol. 13, 1976, pp. 3370-3397 ; part 2, Phys. Rev. D, Vol. 15, 1977, 2397 
 Dynamical mass generation in continuum quantum chromodynamics, Phys. Rev. D, Vol. 26, 1982, p. 1453

References

External links 

 Oral history interview transcript with John Cornwall and Malvin Ruderman in June 2004, American Institute of Physics, Niels Bohr Library & Archives

20th-century American physicists
21st-century American physicists
Harvard University alumni
University of Denver alumni
University of California, Berkeley alumni
University of California, Los Angeles faculty
Fellows of the American Physical Society
Fellows of the American Association for the Advancement of Science
Members of JASON (advisory group)
1934 births
Living people